The Peruvian football champions are the winners of the highest league in Peruvian football, which is currently named as Liga 1 and organized by Peruvian Football Federation. The Liga Peruana de Football was established in 1912. It was an amateur league that lasted until 1921 due to scheduling and organizing conflicts. In this league only teams from Lima participated. In 1926, the Peruvian Football Federation took control of organizing the tournament and continued the Peruvian Primera División with the introduction of teams from Callao. In 1951, the Primera División turned professional and in 1966, the Torneo Descentralizado was founded in which the first non-capital teams were invited to play the first national championship. Between 1996 and 2008, the Apertura and Clausura format was adopted.

In its early stages the first division was dominated by Universitario and Alianza Lima. Other notable teams were Atlético Chalaco, Sport Boys and Deportivo Municipal. The professional era saw Sporting Cristal rise to challenge the dominance of Universitario and Alianza Lima. These three teams account for nearly a third of the titles won. Melgar, Juan Aurich and Binacional are the only teams outside the Lima Region to have won national titles. As of 2022, the league title has been won by over 21 clubs but Universitario, Alianza Lima, and Sporting Cristal share a total of 71 titles of the 106 titles contested. Universitario and Alianza Lima alone account for 51 of the titles contested.

Amateur league (1912–1950)
Peruvian football had amateur status since its foundation until 1950. In the course of this era, Alianza Lima, Atlético Chalaco, Municipal, Sport Boys, and Universitario de Deportes shared the most titles. The first run from 1912 to 1921 featured clubs only from Lima under the Liga Peruana de Football and were awarded the Escudo Dewar (Dewar Shield, after a trophy gifted to the League by the British Embassy). In 1926 and 1927 two unofficial tournaments were played. In 1928 the first championship official expanded to Callao under the Peruvian Football Federation. In 1936 no tournament took place, however an unofficial tournament were played, where Universitario and Alianza Lima were champion and runner-up respectively.

Liga Peruana de Football (1912–1921)

Liga de Lima & Callao (1926–1950)

Professional league (1951–present)
In 1951 the league obtained professional status and in 1966 expanded the league to the entire nation, beginning the Descentralizado.

Tournament names:
 1966–2018: "Torneo Descentralizado"
 2019–present: "Liga 1"

Clubs
Universitario and Alianza Lima have a clear advantage of titles won over the other clubs in Peru. They have won a combined total of 51 Primera División championships of the 106 seasons contested, 26 and 25 respectively. Sporting Cristal trails behind with 20 professional era titles since their debut in 1956 and further behind is the traditional Sport Boys having conquered 6 league titles. Newcomer Universidad de San Martín de Porres has begun to challenge the dominance of the Big Three with back-to-back titles in 2007 and 2008 and a third i 2010. In addition, Melgar and Unión Huaral are the only clubs outside the metropolitan area of Lima to have won a national championship. Other noteworthy clubs to have won championships include 4-time winner Deportivo Municipal.

Universitario is the club with the longest spell in the Primera División, playing since 1928 when they debuted in the Primera División. They are followed by archrivals Alianza Lima who competed in the first edition of the Primera División but were relegated in 1938 and returning a year later for an uninterrupted spell since 1940. Melgar is the team with the longest run in the Primera División outside Lima, competing since 1971.

The oldest clubs currently participating in the Primera División are Alianza Lima and Cienciano which were founded at the beginning of the turn of the century in 1901. The newest clubs active in the Primera División include Ayacucho, Sport Huancayo, Cusco and Universidad de San Martín. The current Juan Aurich participating in the Descentralizado is not the same club that competed in previous seasons.

As of 2022, Universitario, Alianza Lima and Sporting Cristal have won 26, 25 and 20 official league titles respectively. They are regarded as the Big Three of Peru. However, other teams have risen to new heights. In particular, a team from Cusco, Cienciano, has been the only Peruvian team to win international tournaments || Copa Sudamericana 2003 and Recopa Sudamericana 2004 ||, though it has yet to win the domestic league title. Other notable teams include Binacional, Juan Aurich, Melgar and Unión Huaral, which are the only non-capital teams to have won a national championship.

Titles by club

Titles by club
There are 21 clubs who have won the Peruvian title.
Teams in bold compete in the Liga 1 as of the 2023 season.
Italics indicates clubs that no longer exist or disaffiliated from the FPF.

Titles by region

Title definitions
Several matches to define champions have been played over the course of Peruvian football history. The earliest title-defining matches were played between teams that tied for first place at the end of the season or tournament phase and forced an extra match to determine the champion. Eventually, finals were organized to be played at the end of the season after set conditions were fulfilled or tournament winners. The first of these finals started in the eighties when winners of each regional tournament played each other to determine the season champion; if the same team won both tournaments, they were champions by default. In the late nineties the Apertura and Clausura tournaments were hosted so that the winners of each tournament would also face each other in the final. If the same team won both tournaments, they were champions by default.

In 2001, Alianza Lima won the Apertura tournament, but their performance in the Clausura tournament suffered and placed a shocking 10th place—which led to a rule change. A tournament-winning team had to place above a set place in order to be able to play the final. In the cases of the seasons of 2002, 2007 and 2008, one or both of the tournament winners failed to place above a set position therefore no final was played and the season champion was determined by the aggregate table or by the tournament winner that had satisfied the set conditions.

Key

List of finals

Other definitions
These matches were played when teams were tied for first in the general league or in a specific tournament.

Half-year tournaments

Parallel tournaments
These were the filler tournaments played parallel to or in between the national championship. Some of these tournaments awarded the winning clubs with a qualification to an international tournament or guaranteed a spot in a further round whilst two of these filler tournaments did not award anything to its winner. The purpose of these tournaments was so that the national team could participate in its compromises without affecting the national championship when calling domestic players.

Regional seasons
The first regional seasons began in 1984 where teams were divided into regional groups and would advance to the Descentralizado or descend to the Torneo Intermedia for a promotion/relegation tournament against second division teams. Only the 1984 regional did not crown a champion. Starting in 1989, the Descentralizado was temporarily replaced by two regional tournaments, each crowning a champion and contesting a national season final.

Apertura and Clausura / Fase 1 and Fase 2 seasons
In 1997, the first Apertura and Clausura half-year tournaments were introduced and had its champions face each other in a season final as in the regional tournaments between 1989 and 1991. They were abolished at the end of 2008 season, and restored in 2014 to 2019.

Total Half-year tournaments by club

National Cups and Supercups
Throughout the history of Peruvian football, tournaments have been divided into a few stages or have employed filler tournaments played alongside the Descentralizado due to the Peru national football team's compromises, be it FIFA World Cup qualification, FIFA World Cup participation, or Copa América.

National Cups

Supercups

Footnotes

A. Melgar is recognized as the third-placed team for 1992 regular season. Ovación Sipesa received the berth for the 1993 Copa CONMEBOL as Liguilla runner-up, however they did not participate in the 1992 regular season.
C. Includes titles as "Federación Universitaria" (until 1932).
D. Includes titles as "Sport Alianza" (Liga).
E.  Liga team from Lima, not to be confused with José Gálvez from Chimbote.

References

Peruvian Primera División
Peru